Gilberto Buta Lutucuta is the ambassador of Angola to Côte d'Ivoire.

References

Angolan diplomats
Ambassadors of Angola to Ivory Coast
Living people
Year of birth missing (living people)
Place of birth missing (living people)